Bror Axel (Lille Bror) Söderlundh (21 May 1912 – 23 August 1957) was a Swedish composer and singer. He composed music for many Swedish films. He also wrote classical music, including the Concertino for Oboe and Strings which has been performed by the conductor Esa-Pekka Salonen.

He was born in 1912 in Kristinehamn. In 1929 he moved to Stockholm and studied violin.

In 1940, he worked on the anti-nazi satire performance of Den ökända hästen från Troja (The Notorious Horse from Troy) with Karl Gerhard.

He married ceramisist and textile artist Lisbet Jobs and they had two children, Michael Söderlundh and Stina Söderlundh.

Selected works

Opera
 Flygande trumman, Children's Opera (1953); libretto by Lennart Hellsing

Orchestra
 Fyra korta sommarstycken (4 Short Summer Melodies) for string orchestra (1933)
 Tre folkliga valser for string orchestra (1945)
 Vintermåne, Meditation for oboe, 2 clarinets and string orchestra (1945)
 Nattvisa till Lindelin for string orchestra (1946)
 Nattvisa till Lindelin for string orchestra (1946)
 Till en koreograf, Ballet Suite (1946)
 Valsintermezzo for chamber orchestra (1947)
 Kejsarn av Portugallien (The Emperor of Portugallia), Ballet Suite (1950)
 Adagio for string orchestra (1956)
 Ostinato, Studie II for string orchestra (1956)
 Christina-Musik, Suite for string orchestra (published 1958)
 Fem visor for chamber orchestra and jazz combo
 Polka

Concertante
 Allegro concertante for 2 violins and string orchestra (1935)
 Concertino for oboe and string orchestra (1944)
 Dalamusik for clarinet and string orchestra (1945)
 Havängsvit for piano and string orchestra (1945–1953)
 Siciliana seria for viola and string orchestra (1946)
 Concerto for violin and orchestra (1954)
 Concerto No.2 for violin and orchestra (1951)

Chamber music
 Adagio for string quartet (1933)
 Tre små stycken for violin, cello and harp (1938)
 Liten vals for two guitars (1942)
 Enkelt stycke (A Single Piece) for flute and piano (1944)
 Liten svit nr 1 for clarinet and piano (1945)
 Sommarmusik, Little Suite for flute, oboe, violin, cello and harp (1945)
 Stämningsbilder, Quintet for flute, oboe, violin, cello and harp (1946)
 Idea 1 & 2 for saxophone quartet (1949)
 Vid en ung diktares bortgång for string quartet (1954)
 Zwei Inventionen (Two Inventions) for clarinet or viola and piano (organ ad lib.) (1955)
 Fria variationer på eget tema (Free Variations on an Original Theme) for violin, viola and cello (1957)
 Lyrisk svit for violin or flute, viola and guitar
 Miniatyrer for 2 violins (premiere 1996)
 Canzonetta for violin and piano

Piano
 Soave for piano (1947)
 Allegro
 Vals - Pesante - Polka for piano 4-hands

Choral
 Casida om den klara döden for female chorus and piano (1940); words by Federico García Lorca
 Tre kosteliga ting for female chorus and piano (1943–1949); words by Ingegerd Granlund
 Ynglingen och stjärnan, Cantata for soloists, mixed chorua and orchestra (1951); words by Owe Husahr
 Impressioner till Hugo Alfvén for narrator, soloists, mixed chorus and string quartet (1952); words by Rune Lindström
 Tre madrigaler for mixed chorus a cappella (1952); words by Gunnar Björling
 Tvenne madrigaler i Wivallii anda for male chorus (or mixed chorus) a cappella (1952); words by Rune Lindström
 Herre, lär mig betänka for mixrd chorus a cappella (1956); Biblical text: Psalms 39:5
 Det är ej tid for mixed chorus a cappella (published 1961); words by Harald Forss
 Dig är en törnkrans for male chorus a cappella; words by Gunnar Björling
 För vilsna fötter sjunger gräset for male chorus or mixed chorus a cappella (published 1953); words by Hjalmar Gullberg
 Höstsyrsan for male chorus a cappella (published 1961); words by Harry Martinson
 Inte ens en grå liten fågel for male chorus a cappella; words by Nils Ferlin
 Jag biter i himlen for male chorus a cappella; words by Sven Alfons
 Jag skall hålla mig i min hand for mixed chorus a cappella; words by Sven Alfons
 Kväll i inlandet for male chorus a cappella; words by Harry Martinson
 Lärkan for male chorus a cappella; words by Ragnar Jändel
 Människans hem for male chorus a cappella; words by Erik Blomberg
 Nattmusik for male chorus a cappella (published 1961); words by Anna Greta Wide
 Så ensam for female chorus and piano; words by Maria Wine
 Sång till Dalarna for male chorus a cappella; words by August Berglund

Vocal
 Jag var ett speglande vatten for voice and piano (1945); words by Emil Zilliacus
 Vitt land for voice and piano (1945); words by Ebba Lindqvist
 Tuna-svit for soprano, baritone and chamber orchestra (1951); words by Owe Husahr
 Impressioner till Hugo Alfven for voice and string quartet (1952)
 Då är du en frostros på rutan for voice and piano; words by Moa Martinson
 En valsmelodi for voice and piano; words by Nils Ferlin
 Inte ens for voice and piano; words by Nils Ferlin
 Jag ville vara tårar for voice and piano; words by Erik Blomberg
 Sorgmantel och andra visor for voice and piano or guitar
 Stjärnan i din hand for voice and piano; words by Owe Husahr
 Vaxkabinett for 2 sopranos, alto and piano
 Vilse for voice and piano; words by Nils Ferlin

Film scores

Notes and references

 Mattsson, Christina (2000). Lille Bror Söderlundh: Tonsättare och viskompositör. Atlantis. .

External links
 Lille Bror Söderlundh at the Swedish Music Information Centre
 

Swedish male classical composers
1912 births
1957 deaths
20th-century Swedish male singers
20th-century classical musicians
20th-century composers